A cupcone (the common US term), is a small cake generally proportioned to serve one person, specifically baked in a flat bottomed ice cream cone.  As with larger cakes, frosting and other cake decorations, such as sprinkles, are common on cupcones. The consumable vessel design of a cupcone makes for a completely edible and self-contained snack food with no waste.

History
Although the origins of the recipe and the first use of the term are unclear, cupcones and cupcake cones have been a party favorite in recent history. The term cupcone is used to describe a cupcake product cooked in a flat bottomed ice cream cone instead of a paper cup in order to eliminate the waste paper after consumption.  

The cupcone takes its name from the common recipe of a cake whose ingredients were measured by volume, using a standard cup, instead of being weighed. Recipes whose ingredients were measured using a standard-sized cup could also be baked in cups; however, they were more commonly baked in tins as layers or loaves. In later years, when the use of volume measurements was firmly established in home kitchens, these recipes became known as 1234 cakes or quarter cakes, so called because they are made up of four ingredients in equal ratios; butter, sugar, eggs and flour. They are plain yellow cakes, somewhat less rich and less expensive than pound cake, due to the reduced proportion of butter. The names of these two major classes of cakes were intended to signal the method to the baker; "cup cake" uses a volume measurement, and "pound cake" uses a weight measurement.

Cupcones can be used interchangeably with cupcakes that are often served during a celebration, such as children's birthday parties. Additionally, they can be served as an accompaniment to afternoon tea. Cupcones are a more convenient alternative to a full-sized cake as they don't require utensils or division into individual portions.

Notes and references

American cakes